Clinton is the name of several places in the U.S. state of Wisconsin:
Clinton, Barron County, Wisconsin, a town
Clinton (town), Rock County, Wisconsin, a town
Clinton (village), Rock County, Wisconsin, a village
Clinton, Vernon County, Wisconsin, a town